John Bennett Perry (born January 4, 1941) is an American actor, singer and former model. He is the father of actor Matthew Perry.

Life and career
Perry was born on January 4, 1941, in Williamstown, Massachusetts, the son of businessman, bank director and civic leader Alton L. Perry (1906–2003) and Maria (née Bennett, 1910–1970). He attended college at St. Lawrence University, where he was a member of Phi Sigma Kappa fraternity. He married twice. His first wife was Suzanne Langford, a former press secretary to Canadian Prime Minister Pierre Trudeau, with whom he fathered son Matthew Perry. Perry and Langford divorced before Matthew's first birthday. He has a daughter, born 1982, with his second and current wife, Debbie.

His stage credits include the 1967 musical, Now Is the Time for All Good Men. He also appeared as an extra in the crowd scene in the “Tomorrow Belongs To Me” segment in the 1972 film Cabaret.

Perry portrayed the clean-shaven "sailor" in the Old Spice commercials of the 1970s and 1980s. 

Perry has appeared in numerous films such as Lipstick (1976), Midway (1976), The Legend of the Lone Ranger (1981), Only When I Laugh (1981), Independence Day (1996) and George of the Jungle (1997), and on such television programs as  The West Wing; L.A. Law; Days of Our Lives; Little House on the Prairie; Centennial; 240-Robert; Nakia; Falcon Crest; Murder, She Wrote; Diagnosis Murder; and Magnum, P.I.. He played General Douglas MacArthur in the 1989 film Farewell to the King.

In the 1978–79 TV season, he and Stephanie Edwards co-hosted EveryDay, a syndicated daytime talk/variety series that also featured Murray Langston, Tom Chapin, Bob Corff and Anne Bloom. He and Edwards were both nominated for a Daytime Emmy Award for Outstanding Host or Hostess in a Talk, Service or Variety Series.

He appeared alongside his son, Matthew Perry, in the 1997 movie Fools Rush In, and in the episode "My Unicorn" of the sitcom Scrubs, each time as the father of his real-life son's character. He also appeared in an episode of Friends, "The One with Rachel's New Dress", playing the father of Rachel Green's boyfriend Joshua.

Filmography

Film

Television

References

External links

Bio at Yahoo! Movies

1941 births
American male film actors
American male television actors
American male voice actors
American male video game actors
British male film actors
British male television actors
British male voice actors
British male video game actors
Living people
Male actors from Massachusetts
Male models from Massachusetts
People from Williamstown, Massachusetts
Singers from Massachusetts
St. Lawrence University alumni
American expatriate male actors in the United Kingdom